Brantford—Brant (formerly just Brant) is a provincial electoral district in southwestern, Ontario, Canada. The district elects one member to the Legislative Assembly of Ontario. It was created in 1999 from all of Brantford and part of Brant—Haldimand. When the riding was created, it included the city of Brantford, the town of Paris plus the townships of Brantford and South Dumfries.

In 2007, the boundaries were altered to include all of Brant County, plus that part of the Indian Reserves of Six Nations 40 and New Credit 40A located in Haldimand County. For the 2018 election, the riding was renamed Brantford-Brant. The riding also existed from 1926 to 1975; It was known as Brant County until 1934.

Boundaries
In 1987 the new riding of Brant-Haldimand was created to include Brant County (except the city of Brantford), the township of North Dumfries (excluding the part that extended east of Cambridge), and the municipalities of Haldimand, and Dunnville. In 1996, the riding was abolished into Cambridge, Brant, Haldimand—Norfolk—Brant and Erie—Lincoln.

Members of Provincial Parliament

Election results

2007 electoral reform referendum

References

Sources
Elections Ontario Past Election Results
Map of Brantford-Brant riding for 2018 election

Politics of Brantford
Ontario provincial electoral districts